Desulfobotulus sapovorans is a bacterium from the genus of Desulfobotulus which has been isolated from freshwater mud in Germany.

References

Further reading

External links 
Type strain of Desulfobotulus sapovorans at BacDive -  the Bacterial Diversity Metadatabase

Bacteria described in 1981
Desulfovibrio